House of Prince A/S, is a Danish cigarette manufacturer. As Denmark's only cigarette manufacturer, it was an independent subsidiary of Scandinavian Tobacco Company until its sale to British American Tobacco in 2008.

In 2005, House of Prince posted sales of DKK 12.66 billion ($2.15 billion).

History
The history of House of Prince dates to 1990 during reconstruction of Scandinavian Tobacco Company, and now houses all cigarette tobacco manufacturing of that company. The factory was built in 1951 and is located in Søborg, Denmark and produced approximately 60 million cigarettes daily.

The Prince cigarette was launched in 1957. The company produces about 12 million cigarettes by year. The factory closed in 2011.

The company supplies 95% of the Danish market and 37% of the Scandinavian market. The brand Prince has a market share of 34% of the Danish market and 42% of the Norwegian market.

Subsidiary companies

 House of Prince AB (Sweden)
 Scandinavian Tobacco S.A. (Poland) 
 Scandinavian Tobacco Eesti AS (Estonia)
 UAB House of Prince Lithuania (Lithuania)
 Scandinavian Tobacco S.R.O. (Czech)
 Scandinavian Tobacco Company Hellas S.A. (Greece)
 Scandinavien Tobacco Hungary kft. (Hungary)

Cigarette brands by House of Prince

 Ava
 Bravo
 Caines
 Cecil
 Cristal
 Christian of Denmark
 Corner - Now known as Pall Mall
 Danton
 Dark
 Delight
 Grom
 Grot
 King's
 LA - Los Angeles
 Look
 Meskie
 Mistral
 Nevada
 Newmore
 North State
 Prince
 Queen's
 Reven
 Rockets
 Rocky Mountains
 Savoy
 Scotsman
 Slim Agenda
 Slim Camelia
 Viking
 Walet
 Wall Street

References

External links
 Official site (archived, 7 Feb 2006)

Tobacco companies of Denmark
Danish companies established in 1990
British American Tobacco